Dove Channel is a direct-to-consumer, over-the-top digital streaming subscription service. Dove Channel offers a library of family-friendly and Christian-based programming. The channel is a partnership between Cinedigm and The Dove Foundation. Collectively, Dove Channel features more than 900 hours of new and original content, as well as classics from television and film.

All genres of movie and television programming are included, from comedy, sci-fi, drama, mystery and action to musicals, documentary, foreign films, and biblical stories. The first exclusive offering on Dove Channel is the first season of Austentatious, a modern take on the works of Jane Austen. All content on the Dove Channel is sortable and searchable using the Dove Rating System, which ranks programs in six key criteria, including sexuality, language, violence, drug and alcohol use, and nudity to ensure appropriate programming for children and families.

References

External links 

 

Internet television channels
Video hosting
Video on demand services
Cinedigm